Laura Moreno may refer to:
 Laura Moreno (gymnast)
 Laura Moreno (footballer)